The men's decathlon event at the 2002 World Junior Championships in Athletics was held in Kingston, Jamaica, at National Stadium on 16 and 17 July.  Junior implements (valid until 2005) were used, i.e. 106.7 cm (3'6) (senior implement) hurdles, as well as 6 kg shot and 1.75 kg discus.

Medalists

Results

Final
16/17 July

Participation
According to an unofficial count, 20 athletes from 15 countries participated in the event.

References

Decathlon
Combined events at the World Athletics U20 Championships